My Daddy Can Whip Your Daddy is an EP released by the Christian metal band Disciple in 1997. There is an alternative cover released.

Track listing 

"My Daddy Can Whip Your Daddy"  – 3:16
"Pharisee"  – 3:44
"Fill My Shoes"  – 4:34
"Fall On Me"  – 3:12
"Easter Bunny"  – 3:23

Personnel 

Based on AllMusic credits:
 Kevin Young – vocals, bass
 Brad Noah – guitar
 Tim Barrett – drums
 Travis Wyrick – engineer, mixing, producer
 Jeff Lysyczyn – producer
 Barry Landis – executive producer
 Ken Love – mastering
 Karen Cronin – design

References

Disciple (band) albums
1997 EPs
Albums produced by Travis Wyrick